This is a list of notable residents of the county of Kent in England who have a Wikipedia page. Persons are grouped by occupation and listed in order of birth. Kent is defined by its current boundaries.

Academics, engineers and scientists
Charles Culmer (c. 1300s) – supposedly built the fishermen's stairs which Broadstairs is named after
William Caxton (c. 1420 – c. 1492) – first person to introduce a printing press into England
Richard Knolles (c. 1545–1610) – Ottoman Empire historian
Richard Baker (1568–1645) – historian
Robert Fludd (1574–1637) – physicist and astrologer
John Tradescant the elder (c. 1575–1638) – gardener and botanist
John Tradescant the Younger (1608–1662) – gardener and botanist
William Harvey (1578–1657) – anatomist
John Wallis (1616–1703) – mathematician given partial credit for the development of modern calculus
Robert Plot (1640–1696) – naturalist and Professor of Chemistry at the University of Oxford
Stephen Gray (1666–1736) – physicist and astronomer
Thomas Steers (1672–1750) – civil engineer and canal builder
Stephen Hales (1677–1761) – physiologist and chemist
George Sale (1697–1736) – Islamic studies scholar
Thomas Bayes (c. 1702–1761) – mathematician and formulator of Bayes' theorem
Edward Jacob – antiquary and naturalist
Edward Nairne (1726–1806) – scientific instrument maker
James Six (1731–1793) – meteorologist and inventor of the maximum minimum thermometer
Catharine Macaulay (1731–1791) – historian
Edward Hasted (1732–1812) – Kent historian
Lionel Lukin (1742–1834) – possible inventor of the lifeboat
William Congreve (1772–1828) – inventor and rocket pioneer
Thomas Frederick Colby (1784–1852) – director of the Ordnance Survey
Richard Jones (1790–1855) – economist
Joshua Trimmer (1795–1857) – geologist
John Stevens Henslow (1796–1861) – botanist and geologist
Anna Atkins (1799–1871) – botanical photographer
George Finlay (1799–1875) – Greek historian
George Newport (1803–1854) – entomologist
Robert Main (1808–1878) – astronomer
Edmund Law Lushington (1811–1893) – Greek scholar and Rector of Glasgow University
Joseph Prestwich (1812–1896) – geologist
Edward Betts (1815–1872) – railway civil engineering contractor
Thomas Russell Crampton (1816–1888) – engineer and designer of the Crampton locomotive
Charles Kettle (1821–1862) – New Zealand town planner
Joseph Lister, 1st Baron Lister (1827–1912) – surgeon and President of the Royal Society
Nathaniel Barnaby (1829–1915) – Chief Constructor of the Royal Navy
Edward James Reed (1830–1906) – Chief Constructor of the Royal Navy
John Hulke (1830–1895) – surgeon and geologist
Alexander Henry Green (1832–1896) – geologist
Fleeming Jenkin (1833–1885) – Professor of Engineering at the University of Edinburgh
Robinson Ellis (1834–1913) – Professor of Latin at Trinity College, Oxford
James Holden (1837–1925) – locomotive engineer
Frank Rutley (1842–1904) – geologist and petrographer
William Robert Brooks (1844–1922) – American astronomer
Henry George Smith (1852–1924) – chemist
James Fletcher (1852–1908) – Canadian entomologist, botanist and writer
Aubyn Trevor-Battye (1855–1922) – zoologist and writer
Henry Watson Fowler (1858–1933) – lexicographer
Alfred North Whitehead (1861–1947) – mathematician and philosopher
Herbert Baker (1862–1946) – South Africa architect
Baillie Scott (1865–1945) – architect
Patrick Young Alexander (1867–1943) – aeronautical pioneer
Frank Finn (1868–1932) – ornithologist
Reginald Punnett (1875–1967) – geneticist and creator of the Punnett square
William Sealy Gosset (1876–1937) – chemist and statistician
Vita Sackville-West (1892–1962) – novelist, traveller and gardener
Henry Tizard (1885–1959) – chemist and inventor
John Edensor Littlewood (1885–1977) – mathematician
Verena Holmes (1889–1964) – mechanical engineer and multi-field inventor
Arthur Waley (1889–1966) – orientalist and sinologist
Reg Balch (1894–1994) – ecologist and photographer
A. J. Arkell (1898–1980) – North African scholar
Stanley Hooker (1907–1984) – jet engine engineer
Simone Weil (1909–1943) – French philosopher and mystic
Richard Beeching, Baron Beeching (1913–1985) – engineer and chairman of British Railways
Maurice Lister (1914–2003) – chemist
Sheila Sherlock (1918–2001) – physician and hepatologist
George E. P. Box (1918–2001) – statistician
John Aspinall (1926–2000) – zoo owner
Peter Hemingway (1929–1995) – architect
David Harvey (born 1935) – Professor of Anthropology at the City University of New York
Michael Pearson (1936–2017) – expert on clocks and clock-making
David L. Clarke (1937–1976) – archaeologist noted for his work on processual archaeology
Diarmaid MacCulloch (born 1951) – Professor of 'the History of the Church' at the University of Oxford
Daniel Tammet (born 1979) – autistic savant and record pi reciter
Sonia Chadwick Hawkes (1933–1999) – archaeologist specialising in the early Middle Ages

Actors
Thomas Robson Brownhill (1821–1864) – theatre actor and comedian
Ellen Ternan (1839–1914) – actress and mistress of Charles Dickens
Francis Robert Benson (1858–1939) – actor and theatre manager
Lilian Braithwaite (1873–1948) – actress and Dame Commander of the Order of the British Empire
Sydney Greenstreet (1875–1954) – actor in films such as Casablanca and The Maltese Falcon
Philip Hewland (1876–1953) – stage and film actor
Victor McLaglen (1886–1956) – 1935 Academy Award winner for Best Actor
Ballard Berkeley (1904–1988) – actor noted for his role as Major Gowen in TV's Fawlty Towers
Margot Grahame (1911–1982) – actress in films such as The Informer and The Crimson Pirate
Harry Andrews (1911–1989) – actor in films such as Superman and Watership Down
Trevor Howard (1913–1988) – Academy Award nominated film actor
Peter Cushing (1913–1994) – film actor of the Hammer Films, Star Wars and Dr Who and the Daleks
Bob Todd (1922–1992) – comedy actor and sidekick of Benny Hill and Spike Milligan
Hattie Jacques (1924–1980) – comedy actress of the Carry On films and TV's Sykes
Frederick Treves (born 1925) – prolific TV actor
Alec McCowen (1925–2017) – Golden Globe nominated film, theatre and TV actor
Peter Barkworth (1929–2006) – BAFTA winning actor
Dinsdale Landen (1932–2003) – TV actor
Lance Percival (1933–2015) – comedy actor
Patsy Byrne (1933–2014) – actress noted for her role as Nursie in TV's Blackadder II
Tom Baker (born 1934) – actor in TV's Doctor Who and Little Britain
Joanna Van Gyseghem (born 1941) – actress in TV's Duty Free and Rumpole of the Bailey
Michael Crawford (born 1942) – Tony Award-winning comedy, film and musical actor
Brenda Blethyn (born 1946) – Academy Award nominated actress
Rusty Goffe (born 1948) – dwarf actor in the films Willy Wonka & the Chocolate Factory and Willow
Fiona Reid (born 1951) – Canadian TV and film actress
Mark Rylance (born 1960) – theatre actor
Jack Dee (born 1962) – TV actor and comedian
Martin Ball (born 1964) – theatre and TV actor
Shaun Williamson (born 1964) – TV presenter and actor in TV's Eastenders
Paul Ritter (1966–2021) – actor in TV's Friday Night Dinner, No Offence
Tamsin Greig (born 1966) – actress in TV's Friday Night Dinner
Naomi Watts (born 1968) – Academy Award nominated actress
Matthew Holness (born c. 1968) – comedy writer and actor in TV's Garth Marenghi's Darkplace
Ben Moor (born 1969) – comedy writer, and actor in TV's Fist of Fun
Mackenzie Crook (born 1971) – actor in TV's The Office
Shane Taylor (born 1973) – actor in TV's Band of Brothers
Chris Simmons (born 1975) – actor in TV's The Bill
Orlando Bloom (born 1977) – actor in the film series The Lord of the Rings and Pirates of the Caribbean
Oliver Chris (born 1978) – actor in TV's Green Wing, The Office and Rescue Me
Kevin Bishop (born 1980) – actor in the film Muppet Treasure Island and TV's Grange Hill
Tom Riley (born 1981) – actor in TV's Da Vinci's Demons and The Nevers
Gemma Arterton (born 1986) – actress
Dominic Sherwood (born 1990) – actor in TV's Shadowhunters
Joseph McManners (born 1992) – musical theatre actor and singer
Tommy Knight (born 1993) – actor in TV's The Sarah Jane Adventures
Jack Scanlon (born 1998) – TV and film actor
Isaac Hempstead-Wright (born 1999) – actor in TV's Game of Thrones
Hrvy (born 1999) – presenter from Friday Download   Friday Download<Hrvy></Friday Download>

Artists
William Woollett (1735–1785) – engraver
William Alexander (1767–1816) – painter and illustrator
J. M. W. Turner (c. 1775–1851) – landscape painter
Thomas Sidney Cooper (1803–1902) – painter
Elizabeth Gould (1804–1902) – illustrator
Samuel Palmer (1805–1881) – landscape painter
Richard Dadd (1817–1886) – painter
John Hassall (1868–1948) – illustrator
Mary Tourtel (1874–1948) – artist and creator of Rupert Bear
Margaret Beale (1886–1969) – marine artist
Colin Gill (1892–1940) – painter
Hugh Cecil (1889–c. 1939) – photographer
Compton Bennett (1900–1974) – film director and producer
Tyrone Guthrie (1900–1971) – Tony Award-winning theatre director
Don Potter (1902–2004) – sculptor
Michael Powell (1905–1990) – film director
Peter Rogers (1914–2009) – film producer of the Carry On series
Oliver Postgate (1925–2008) – animator and co-creator of Bagpuss, The Clangers and Ivor the Engine
Peter Firmin (1928–2018) – animator and co-creator of Basil Brush, Bagpuss and The Clangers
Frank Auerbach (born 1931) – painter
Peter Blake (born 1932) – pop artist, designer of the Sgt Pepper's Lonely Hearts Club Band album sleeve
Mary Quant (born 1930) – fashion designer; inventor of the miniskirt and hot pants
Antoinette Sibley (born 1939) – ballerina
Zandra Rhodes (born 1940) – fashion designer
Tim Page (born 1944) – Vietnam War photojournalist
Roger Dean (born 1944) – album cover artist
Dick Pope (born 1947) – cinematographer
Bill Lewis (born 1953) – founder member of the Stuckists art group
Mike Bernard (born 1957) – painter
Gary Hume (born 1962) – painter
Tracey Emin (born 1963) – Royal Academy artist
Tacita Dean (born 1965) – visual artist
Angus Fairhurst (born 1966) – photographic and visual artist
Joe Machine (born 1973) – founder member of the Stuckists art group
Remy Noe (born 1974) – founder member of the Stuckists art group
George Henry Horton (born 1993) – filmmaker

Clergy
Laurence of Canterbury (?–619) – saint and the second Archbishop of Canterbury
Paulinus of York (?–644) – first Bishop of York
Edith of Wilton (961–984) – saint and illegitimate daughter of King Edgar the Peaceful
William Addison (1883–1962) – recipient of the Victoria Cross
Thomas Becket (c. 1118–1170) – saint and Archbishop of Canterbury
John Kemp (c. 1380–1454) – Archbishop of Canterbury and Lord Chancellor
John Morton (c. 1420–1500) – Archbishop of Canterbury and Lord Chancellor
John Frith (1503–1533) – Protestant priest and writer, executed for heresy
Roger Filcock (c. 1553–1601) – executed for preaching Catholicism
Dudley Fenner (c. 1558–1587) – puritan theologian
Edmund Duke (1563–1590) – martyr, executed for preaching Catholicism
Richard Clarke (?–1634) – Anglican scholar and preacher
John Lothropp (1584–1653) – Anglican minister and founder of Barnstable, Massachusetts
Robert Abbot (c. 1588–c. 1662) – Puritan theologian
Peter Gunning (1614–1684) – Royalist and Bishop of Chichester
William Wall (1647–1728) – Anglican theologian
White Kennett (1660–1728) – Bishop of Peterborough
Nathanial Lardner (1684–1768) – theologian
Edward Perronet (1726–1792) – Anglican preacher
George Horne (1730–1792) – Bishop of Norwich
Charles Thomas Longley (1794–1868) – Archbishop of Canterbury
Henry Edward Manning (1808–1892) – cardinal
Alfred Saker (1814–1880) – Baptist missionary
George Hills (1816–1895) – Bishop of British Columbia
Christopher Newman Hall (1816–1902) – Anglican abolitionist
John R. Winder (1821–1910) – leader of The Church of Jesus Christ of Latter-day Saints
Edward King (1829–1910) – Anglican bishop
E. W. Bullinger (1837–1913) – Anglican clergyman, Biblical scholar, and dispensationalist theologian
Arthur Tooth (1839–1931) – Anglican clergyman, prosecuted under the Public Worship Regulation Act 1874
John Neale Dalton (1839–1931) – chaplain to Queen Victoria and tutor to George V of the United Kingdom
Charles Bousfield Huleatt (1863–1908) – Anglican priest and discoverer of the Magdalen papyrus
Nelson Wellesley Fogarty (1871–1933) – Bishop of Damaraland, Namibia
Frank W. Boreham (1871–1959) – Baptist theologian
Edward Knapp-Fisher (1915–2003) – Sub-Dean of Westminster Abbey
John A. T. Robinson (1919–1983) – Bishop of Woolwich

Entrepreneurs
William Adams (1564–1620) – trader and first British navigator to reach Japan
William Claiborne (c. 1600-c. 1677) – early settler of Virginia and Maryland
Christopher Branch (c. 1600–1682) – early settler of Virginia
Thomas Fairfax, 6th Lord Fairfax of Cameron (1692–1781) – landowner in Virginia
William Colgate (1783–1857) – founder of the Colgate toothpaste company
Gregory Blaxland (1788–1852) – settler of Australia and wine-maker
Thomas Fletcher Waghorn (1800–1850) – postal pioneer who developed a new route from Great Britain to India
Darrell Duppa (1832–1892) – co-founder of Phoenix, Arizona
Edward William Cole (1832–1918) – successful bookshop owner in Melbourne, Australia
Charles Elkin Mathews (1851–1921) – publisher and bookseller
George Marchant (1857–1941) – soft-drink manufacturer in Australia
Bronson Albery (1881–1971) – theatre director and impresario
Freddie Laker (1922–2006) – founder of Laker Airways
Ian Davis (born 1952) – Managing Director of McKinsey & Company
John Charman (born 1953) – CEO/President/Director of Bermuda-based Axis Capital Holdings Ltd

Musicians
John Ward (1571–1638) – composer
John Jenkins (1592–1678) – composer
John Gostling (1644–1733) – bass singer and a favourite of Charles II of England
Isaac Nathan (c. 1792–1864) – English-Australian musician
George Job Elvey (1816–1993) – organist and composer
Sydney Nicholson (1875–1947) – founder of the Royal School of Church Music
Edward Norman Hay (1889–1943) – composer and musicologist
Malcolm Sargent (1895–1967) – leading conductor of choral works
Percy Whitlock (1903–1946) – organist and composer
Roy Douglas (born 1907) – composer
Alfred Deller (1912–1979) – opera singer
Daphne Oram (1925–2003) – composer and electronic musician
Tony Coe (born 1934) – jazz musician
Bill Wyman (born 1936) – bassist for the band The Rolling Stones
Richard Rodney Bennett (born 1936) – film score and jazz composer
Crispian St. Peters (1939–2010) – pop singer
Mick Jagger (born 1943) – singer and songwriter for the band The Rolling Stones
Keith Richards (born 1943) – guitarist and songwriter for the band The Rolling Stones
Dick Taylor (born 1943) – bassist for the band The Rolling Stones
Mike Ratledge (born 1943) – keyboardist for the band Soft Machine
Phil May (born 1944) – singer for the band The Pretty Things
Kevin Ayers (born 1944) – singer and bassist for the band Soft Machine
Judge Dread (1945–1998) – reggae and ska artist
Hugh Hopper (born 1945) – progressive rock and jazz bass guitarist and composer
Noel Redding (1945–2003) – bassist for the band The Jimi Hendrix Experience
John Paul Jones (born 1946) – bassist, keyboardist and co-songwriter for English rock band Led Zeppelin
Trevor Pinnock (born 1946) – conductor and harpsichordist
Richard Coughlan (born 1947) – drummer for the band Caravan
Dave Sinclair (born 1947) – keyboardist for the band Caravan
Gordon Giltrap (born 1948) – guitarist and composer
Richard Sinclair (born 1948) – guitarist for the band Caravan
Bill Bruford (born 1949) – drummer for the bands Yes and King Crimson
Nigel Egg (born 1949) – singer/songwriter
Peter Frampton (born 1950) – musician, most famous for Frampton Comes Alive!
Alan Clayson (born 1951) – record producer and songwriter
Harry Christophers (born 1953) – conductor
David Wright (born 1953) – New Age keyboard player and composer
Gary Barden (born 1955) – songwriter and guitarist for the band Michael Schenker Group
Anne Dudley (born 1956) – orchestral composer and pop musician
Sid Vicious (1957–1979) – bassist for the band The Sex Pistols
Shane MacGowan (born 1957) – singer and songwriter for the band The Pogues
Kate Bush (born 1958) – pop musician
Billy Childish (born 1959) – singer, guitarist, artist and poet
Pete Tong (born 1960) – record producer and DJ for BBC Radio 1
Guy Fletcher (born 1960) – keyboardist for the band Dire Straits
Boy George (born 1961) – singer with the band Culture Club
Sexton Ming (born 1961) – musician, artist and poet
Andrew Giddings (born 1963) – keyboardist for the band Jethro Tull
Paul Oakenfold (born 1963) – record producer and DJ
Nitin Sawhney (born 1964) – songwriter and record producer
Jay Darlington (born 1968) – keyboardist for the band Kula Shaker
Omar Lye-Fook (born 1968) – soul singer, songwriter and musician
Justin Chancellor (born 1971) – bass player for the rock band Tool
Richard Hughes (born 1975) – drummer for the band Keane
Tom Perchard (born 1976) – musicologist
David Ford (born 1978) – singer-songwriter
Vicky Beeching (born 1979) – worship leader and musician
Ben Mills (born 1980) – singer and contestant on TV's The X Factor
Rik Waller (born 1980) – singer and contestant on TV's Pop Idol
Lee Ryan (born 1983) – member of the boy band Blue
Oliver Sykes (born 1986) – metal singer
Joss Stone (born 1987) – BRIT and Grammy Award-winning R&B singer/songwriter
Declan Galbraith (born 1991) – singer

Politicians, statesmen and lawyers
Charles Abbott, 1st Baron Tenterden (1762–1832) – Lord Chief Justice
Aretas Akers-Douglas, 1st Viscount Chilston (1851–1926) – Conservative Home Secretary
Jeffrey Amherst, 1st Baron Amherst (1717–1797) – Governor General of British North America
Josceline Amherst (1846–1900) – member of Western Australia's first Legislative Council under responsible government
Richard Ash Kingsford (1821–1902) – alderman and mayor of Brisbane Municipal Council, a Member of the Legislative Assembly of Queensland, Australia, and a mayor of Cairns, Queensland
Bob Astles (1924–2012) – associate of Ugandan presidents Milton Obote and Idi Amin
Wallace Bickley (1810–1876) – early settler of Western Australia and Member of the Western Australian Legislative Council
Anne Boleyn (c. 1501–1536) – wife of King Henry VIII
Francis Bond Head (1793–1875) – Lieutenant-Governor of Upper Canada during the rebellion of 1837
Jonathan Bowden (1962–2012) – writer and political theorist
Richard Boyle, 1st Earl of Cork (1566–1643) – Lord High Treasurer of the Kingdom of Ireland
Audrey Callaghan (1915–2005) – Greater London Councillor and wife of Prime Minister James Callaghan
Thomas Cheney (c. 1485–1558) – Lord Warden of the Cinque Ports
Martin Conway (1856–1937) – Member of Parliament and art critic
Nicky Crane (1958–1993) – neo-Nazi activist
Sackville Crowe (c. 1611 – c. 1683) – Member of Parliament and Ambassador to the Ottoman Empire
Heneage Finch, 1st Earl of Nottingham (1621–1682) – Lord Chancellor
Sir John Peyton (died 1558) – Governor of Jersey
John Scott of Scott's Hall (died 1485) – Lord Warden of the Cinque Ports
William Scott of Scott's Hall (died 1524) – Lord Warden of the Cinque Ports
Miles Sindercombe (died 1657) – leader of a group that tried to assassinate Oliver Cromwell
Henry Stafford, 1st Baron Stafford (1501–1563) – peer
Roger Twysden (1597–1672) – politician and antiquarian
James Weaver (1800–1886) – Wisconsin State Assemblyman
The Countess of Wessex (Sophie, born 1965) – wife of The Earl of Wessex
Nicholas Wotton (c. 1497–1567) – ambassador to France
Philip Yorke, 1st Earl of Hardwicke (1690–1764) – Lord Chancellor
Henry Young (1808–1870) – fifth Governor of South Australia
Thomas Hinckley, (Tenterden, Kent, England; (1618–1706) – Governor Plymouth Colonies (1680–1692)
Francis Lovelace (1621–1675) – second governor of the New York colony
Daniel Horsmanden (c. 1691 – c. 1778) – judge who tried the supposed conspirators in the New York Slave Insurrection of 1741
Thomas Paine (1737–1809) – revolutionary
Charles Larkin (1775–1833) – electoral reformer
Elizabeth Fry (1780–1845) – prison reformer
Sir Edward Knatchbull, 9th Baronet (1781–1849) – Conservative Member of Parliament for East Kent
George Gipps (1791–1847) – Governor of the colony of New South Wales, Australia
William Locke Brockman (1802–1872) – early settler of Western Australia and Member of the Western Australian Legislative Council
Edmund Walker Head (1805–1868) – Governor General of the Province of Canada
Charles Sladen (1816–1884) – sixth Premier of Victoria, Australia
Edith Pechey (1845–1908) – suffragette and one of the first UK female doctors
George Herbert Murray (1849–1936) – civil servant and Permanent Secretary of the Treasury
William Hall-Jones (1851–1936) – Prime Minister of New Zealand
Janet Stancomb-Wills (1851–1932) – mayor of Ramsgate and philanthropist
Henry Forster, 1st Baron Forster (1866–1936) – seventh Governor-General of Australia
Grote Stirling (1875–1953) – Member of Parliament in Canada
Wendy Wood (1892–1981) – campaigner for Scottish independence
Philip Lucock (1916–1996) – Deputy Speaker of the House of Representatives in Australia
Edward Heath (1916–2005) – Prime Minister of the United Kingdom
Ron Ledger (1920–2004) – Labour Member of Parliament
John Vinelott (1923–2006) – High Court judge
Jeanne Hoban (1924–1997) – trade unionist in Sri Lanka
Geoff Braybrooke (1935–2013) – New Zealand Member of Parliament
Brian Haw (1949–2011) – anti-war protester
The Princess Royal (Anne; born 1950) – only daughter of The Queen
Nick Brown (born 1950) – Labour Member of Parliament
John Redwood (born 1951) – Conservative Member of Parliament
James Arbuthnot (born 1952) – Conservative Member of Parliament
Paul Clark (born 1957) – Labour Member of Parliament 
Sean Gabb (born 1960) – director of the free market and civil liberties think-tank, Libertarian Alliance
Nigel Farage (born 1964) – leader of the UK Independence Party (UKIP)

Presenters and entertainers
Kenneth Clark (1903–1983) – art historian and TV presenter
Frank Muir (1920–1998) – comedy writer and TV presenter
Michael Bentine (1922–1996) – comedian and member of the Goons
Tony Hart (1925–2009) – artist and children's TV presenter
Bob Holness (1928–2011) – presenter of TV's Blockbusters and Call My Bluff
Rod Hull (1935–1999) – TV entertainer, known for his puppet Emu
David Frost (1939–2013) – TV presenter, satirist and journalist
Jan Leeming (born 1942) – TV presenter and newsreader
Roger Day (born 1945) – radio presenter for BBC Radio Kent
David Starkey (born 1945) – historian and TV presenter
Reg Bolton (1945–2006) – circus clown and writer
Michael Hogben (born 1952) – antiques dealer and presenter of TV's Auction Man
Jilly Goolden (born 1956) – wine critic and TV presenter
Lorraine Michaels (born 1958) – Playboy magazine's Playmate of the Month for April 1981
Carol McGiffin (born 1960) – radio presenter and panellist on TV's Loose Women
Ian Hislop (born 1960) – TV presenter and editor of Private Eye magazine
Fiona Phillips (born 1961) – presenter of TV's GMTV
Mark Steel (born 1960) – socialist comedian and newspaper columnist
Anton Vamplew (born 1966) – astronomer and TV presenter
Nick Bateman (born 1967) – Big Brother contestant, TV presenter and writer
Nicki Chapman (born 1967) – TV presenter and judge on TV's Popstars and Pop Idol
Naomi Cleaver (born 1967) – interior designer and presenter of TV's Other People's Houses and Honey I Ruined the House
David Bull (born 1969) – doctor and guest on TV's Most Haunted Live, The Wright Stuff and Watchdog
Alistair Appleton (born 1970) – presenter of TV's Cash in the Attic and House Doctor
Melanie and Martina Grant (born 1971) – presenters of TV's Fun House
Alex Lovell (born 1973) – presenter of TV's Playhouse Disney and BrainTeaser
James Tanner (born c. 1976) – chef on TV's Ready Steady Cook
Luke Burrage (born 1976) – juggler
Matt Morgan (born 1977) – co-host of Russell Brand's BBC Radio 2 show
Kelly Brook (born 1979) – model, actress and TV presenter

Soldiers
Francis Thynne (c. 1544–1608) – officer of arms at the College of Arms, London
Samuel Argall (1580–1608) – Navy admiral and kidnapper of Pocahontas
Sir William Brockman (1595–1654) – politician and military leader during the English civil war
John Boys (1607–1664) – Royalist captain during the English Civil War
George Rooke (1650–1709) – naval commander during the Dutch Wars
George Byng, 1st Viscount Torrington (1668–1733) – First Lord of the Admiralty
Charles Middleton, 1st Baron Barham (1726–1813) – First Lord of the Admiralty
James Wolfe (1727–1759) – military officer who defeated the French and established British rule in Canada
Charles Cornwallis, 1st Marquess Cornwallis (1738–1805) – British general in the American War of Independence
Peter Rainier (1741–1808) – Royal Navy Admiral and Member of Parliament
John Nicholson Inglefield (1748–1828) – Royal Navy Captain of the Fleet
Arthur Wellesley, 1st Duke of Wellington (1769–1852) – field marshal and Prime Minister of the United Kingdom
Henry Hardinge, 1st Viscount Hardinge (1785–1856) – field marshal and Governor-General of India
James Mouat (1815–1899) – recipient of the Victoria Cross
John Miller Adye (1819–1900) – general
William Sutton (1830–1888) – recipient of the Victoria Cross
George Truman Morrell (1830–1912) – Royal Navy commander
John French, 1st Earl of Ypres (1852–1925) – World War I field marshal
Harold Stephen Langhorne (1866–1932) – brigadier-general
Alexander Godley (1867–1957) – World War I general
Henry Edward Manning Douglas (1875–1939) – recipient of the Victoria Cross
Arthur Borton (1883–1933) – recipient of the Victoria Cross
Thomas Highgate (1895–1914) – first British soldier to be convicted of desertion and executed during World War I
James McCudden (1895–1918) – recipient of the Victoria Cross
Dick White (1906–1993) – Head of the Secret Intelligence Service
Charles Henry Pepys Harington (1910–2007) – general
Roderick Alastair Brook Learoyd (1913–1996) – recipient of the Victoria Cross
Peter Allen Norton (born 1962) – awarded the George Cross for his service in Iraq
Sarah-Jayne Mulvihill (1973–2006) – Flight lieutenant in the Royal Air Force killed in Iraq

Sportsmen
Edwin Stead (1701–1735) – noted cricket patron and team captain in the 1720s and early 1730s
George Louch (1746–1811) – cricketer
Robert Clifford (1752–1811) – cricketer for Kent
Fuller Pilch (1804–1870) – cricketer for Kent and Norfolk
Henry Tracey Coxwell (1819–1900) – balloonist
H T Waghorn (1842–1930) – cricket statistician and historian
Spencer Gore (1850–1906) – first Wimbledon tennis champion
Cuthbert Ottaway (1850–1878) – England football captain
Frank Marchant (1864–1946) – cricketer for Kent
Fred Waghorne (1866–1956) – ice hockey referee in Canada
Douglas Carr (1872–1950) – cricketer for Kent and England
Syd King (1873–1932) – footballer and manager of West Ham United
Archie Cross (1881–unknown) – footballer for Woolwich Arsenal
Edward Walter Solly (1882–1966) – cricketer for Worcestershire
Walter Tull (1888–1918) – UK's second black professional footballer and first black infantry officer
John Stanton Fleming Morrison (1892–1961) – golf course architect
Louis Zborowski (1895–1924) – racing driver
Wally Hammond (1903–1965) – cricketer for Gloucestershire and England
Dick Edmed (1904–1983) – footballer for Liverpool
Les Ames (1905–1990) – cricketer for Kent and England
Alec Rose (1908–1991) – sailed single-handed around the world
Hopper Levett (1908–1995) – cricketer for England
Art Potter (1909–1998) – Canadian ice hockey administrator
Sam King (1911–2003) – golfer
Arthur Fagg (1915–1977) – cricketer for Kent and England
William Murray-Wood (1917–1968) – cricketer for Kent
Jack Conley (1920–1991) – footballer for Torquay United
Ted Ditchburn (1921–2005) – footballer for Tottenham Hotspur and England
Malcolm Allison (1927–2010) – footballer for West Ham United and football manager
Brian Moore (1932–2001) – TV sports commentator
George Wright (1930–1992) – footballer for West Ham United
Brian Luckhurst (1939–2005) – cricketer for Kent and England
Barry Davies (born 1940) – TV sports commentator
Bill Ivy (1942–1969) – motorcycle racer
Brian Rose (born 1950) – cricketer for Somerset and England
Paul Gilchrist (born 1952) – footballer for Southampton, Portsmouth and Swindon Town
Kevin Jarvis (born 1953) – cricketer for Kent and Gloucestershire
Tony Godden (born 1955) – footballer for West Bromwich Albion, Chelsea and Birmingham City
Dave Carr (1957–2005) – footballer for Luton Town and Torquay United
David Gower (born 1957) – England cricket captain and TV presenter
Bob Bolder (born 1958) – footballer for Charlton Athletic, Sunderland and Sheffield Wednesday
Graham Dilley (born 1959) – cricketer for Kent and England
Richard Ellison (born 1959) – cricketer for Kent and England
Barry Knight (born 1960) – football referee
Steve Bennett (born 1961) – football referee
Gary Brazil (born 1962) – footballer for Fulham, Preston North End and Sheffield United
Jamie Spence (born 1963) – golfer
Andy Townsend (born 1963) – TV presenter; footballer for Aston Villa and Republic of Ireland
David Bowman (born 1964) – footballer for Heart of Midlothian, Dundee United and Scotland
Geoff Parsons (born 1964) – Commonwealth Games silver medal winning high jumper
Tim Berrett (born 1965) – Canadian Olympic race walker
Andy Hessenthaler (born 1965) – footballer and manager of Gillingham
Mark Ealham (born 1969) – cricketer for Nottinghamshire and England
Nigel Llong (born 1969) – cricketer for Kent
Doug Loft (born 1986) – footballer
Kelly Holmes (born 1970) – 800 metres and 1500 metres Olympic gold medalist
Mark Hammett (born 1972) – rugby union footballer for New Zealand
Rob Short (born 1972) – field hockey player for Canada
Jamie Staff (born 1973) – Commonwealth Games medal winning cyclist
Gary Breen (born 1973) – footballer for Coventry City, Sunderland and Republic of Ireland
Neil Shipperley (born 1974) – footballer for Crystal Palace, Chelsea and Wimbledon
Takaloo (born 1975) – Iranian boxer
Matthew Rose (born 1975) – footballer for Arsenal, QPR and Yeovil Town
Kevin Hunt (born 1975) – footballer for Gillingham, Hong Kong Rangers and Bohemian FC
Ed Smith (born 1977) – writer, and cricketer for Kent and England
Georgina Harland (born 1978) – 2004 Olympic bronze medallist in the Modern pentathlon
Peter Hawkins (born 1978) – footballer for Wimbledon, York City and Rushden & Diamonds
Jon Harley (born 1979) – footballer for Sheffield United, Fulham and Chelsea
David Flatman (born 1980) – rugby union footballer for Bath and England
Michael Yardy (born 1980) – cricketer for Sussex
Sarah Ayton (born 1980) – Olympic gold medal winning sailor
Gary Mills (born 1981) – footballer for Rushden & Diamonds
Danny Spiller (born 1981) – footballer for Gillingham
Richard Rose (born 1982) – footballer for Gillingham and Hereford United
James Tredwell (born 1982) – cricketer for Kent and England Under–19s
Matt Corker (born 1982) – rugby union footballer for the London Wasps
Rhys Lloyd (born 1982) – American footballer for Frankfurt Galaxy
Lisa Dobriskey (born 1983) – Commonwealth Games 1500 metres gold medallist
Billy Jones (born 1983) – footballer for Leyton Orient and Kidderminster
Barry Fuller (born 1984) – footballer for Barnet and Stevenage
Adam Birchall (born 1984) – footballer for Mansfield Town, Barnet and Wales Under–21s
Andrew Crofts (born 1984) – footballer for Gillingham
Dave Martin (born 1985) – footballer for Crystal Palace
Tom Varndell (born 1985) – rugby union footballer for Leicester Tigers and England
Joe Denly (born 1986) – cricketer for Kent and England Under–19s
Sammy Moore (born 1987) – footballer for Ipswich Town
Zack Sabre Jr (born 1987) – professional wrestler
Chris Smalling (born 1989) – footballer with Manchester United F.C.
Adrian Quaife-Hobbs (born 1991) – Formula BMW racing driver

Writers
Edwin Arnold (1832–1904) – poet and journalist
Edwin Lester Arnold (1857–1935) – author
Alfred Austin (1835–1913) – Poet Laureate
Enid Bagnold (1889–1981) – author and playwright
Rachel Beer (1858–1927) – editor of The Observer and The Sunday Times newspapers
Aphra Behn (1640–1689) – dramatist among earliest professional female writers
Robert Blatchford (1851–1943) – socialist author
Daniel Blythe (born 1969) – author
Robert Bridges (1844–1930) – Poet Laureate
Michael Busselle (1935–2006) – writer and photographer
Elizabeth Carter (1717–1806) – linguist
Geoffrey Chaucer (c. 1343–1400) – diplomat and author of The Canterbury Tales
Joseph Conrad (1857–1924) – novelist
Caroline Cornwallis (1786–1858)
Arthur Shearly Cripps (1869–1952) – poet, writer and Anglican priest
Rana Dasgupta (born 1971) – writer
Charles Dickens (1812–1870) – foremost Victorian novelist
Sarah Dixon (1671/2 – 1765) – poet
Keith Douglas (1920–1944) – poet
David Edwards (born 1962) – political journalist
Ernest Elmore (1901–1957) – writer of fantasy and (as John Bude) crime novels
U. A. Fanthorpe (1929–2009) – poet and recipient of the Queen's Gold Medal for Poetry
Anne Finch, Countess of Winchilsea (1661–1720) – poet
Robert Fisk (1946–2020) – journalist
Phineas Fletcher (1582–1650) – poet
Frederick Forsyth (born 1938) – author of thriller novels such as The Day of the Jackal and The Odessa File
Caroline Fry (1787–1846) – Christian writer
John Fuller (born 1937) – poet and author
John Gillespie Magee, Jr. (1922–1943) – Air Force pilot and poet
John Gower (c. 1330–1408) – poet
Thom Gunn (1929–2004) – Anglo-American poet
Christopher Harte (born 1947) - sports writer and bibliographer
William Hazlitt (1778–1830) – essayist and literary critic
Thomas Head Raddall (1903–1994) – historical fiction writer
David Hewson (born 1953) – crime and mystery novelist
Robert Holdstock (born 1948) – fantasy author
M. R. James (1862–1936) – mediaeval scholar and author
Lionel Johnson (1867–1902) – poet, essayist and critic
Sidney Keyes (1922–1943) – war poet
Winifred Mary Letts (1882–1972) – novelist and poet
Richard Lovelace (1618–1659) – poet and Royalist
John Lyly (c. 1553–1606) – writer and originator of the linguistic style Euphuism
John Lloyd (born 1951) – comedy writer, and TV producer for Blackadder, Spitting Image and Not the Nine O'Clock News
Christopher Marlowe (1564–1593) – dramatist, poet and translator
Ronald James Marsh (1914–1987) – novelist
E. Nesbit (1858–1924) – children's author and poet
William Nicholson (born 1948) – Academy Award nominated screenwriter, playwright, and novelist
William Painter (1540–1594) – author
James Parton (1822–1891) – American biographer
Stel Pavlou (born 1970) – author and screenwriter
Mervyn Peake (1911–1968) – author of the Gormenghast books
Edward Plunkett, 18th Baron Dunsany (1878–1957) – writer and dramatist
Dudley Pope (1925–1997) – author of nautical fiction
Peter Quennell (1905–1993) – poet and literary historian
Bruce Robinson (born 1946) – BAFTA award-winning screenwriter
George W. M. Reynolds (1814–1879) – author
William Pett Ridge (1857–1930) – author
Sarah Sands (born 1961) – editor of The Sunday Telegraph newspaper
Siegfried Sassoon (1886–1967) – war poet
Philip Sidney (1554–1606) – poet and military general
Christopher Smart (1722–1771) – poet
Robert Smythe Hichens (1864–1950) – journalist and novelist
W. Somerset Maugham (1874–1965) – playwright and novelist
David Lee Stone (born 1978) – fantasy author
John Russell Taylor (born 1938) – film critic
Russell Thorndike (1885–1972) – novelist and actor
Thomas Turner (1729–1793) – diarist
Gilbert Waterhouse (1883–1916) – war poet
H. G. Wells (1866–1946) – writer
John Wells (1936–1998) – satirical writer and comedy performer
Norman Worker (1927–2005) – comic book writer
Thomas Wyatt (1503–1400) – poet and diplomat
Dornford Yates (1885–1960) – novelist

Miscellaneous
Mary Carleton (1642–1673) – fraudster
Mary and Eliza Chulkhurst (1100–1134) – one of the earliest known sets of conjoined twins
Kevin Foster (born 1958/59) – investment fraudster
Frank John William Goldsmith (1902–1982) – survivor of the RMS Titanic disaster
Tony Hayward (born 1957) – CEO of BP Group (2007–2010)
Alice Liddell (1852–1934) – inspiration for Alice's Adventures in Wonderland
Marcus Sarjeant (born 1964) – fired six blank shots at Elizabeth II
Sophia Stacey (1791–1874) – friend of poet Percy Bysshe Shelley and writer Mary Shelley
Walter Tirel (1065–1134) – killed William II of England, possibly accidentally
John Ward (c. 1553–1622) – pirate

References

List of people from Kent
Kent
Kent-related lists
Kent